Eois mexicaria is a moth in the  family Geometridae. It is found in Mexico.

The larvae have been recorded feeding on Piper auritum and Piper umbricola.

References

Moths described in 1866
Eois
Moths of Central America